The 7th Central Committee of the Communist Party of Vietnam (CPV) was elected at the 7th CPV National Congress. It elected the 7th Politburo and the 7th Secretariat.

Plenums
The Central Committee (CC) is not a permanent institution. Instead, it convenes plenary sessions between party congresses. When the CC is not in session, decision-making powers are delegated to its internal bodies; that is, the Politburo and the Secretariat. None of these organs are permanent bodies either; typically, they convene several times a month.

Composition

References

Bibliography
 
 
 
 

7th Central Committee of the Communist Party of Vietnam